Parliamentary elections were held in Mauritania on 19 and 26 October 2001. The result was a landslide victory for President Maaouya Ould Sid'Ahmed Taya's Republican Party for Democracy and Renewal, which took 64 of the 81 seats.

Background
Previous elections since the reintroduction of multi-party politics in the early 1990s has seen opposition boycotts due to accusations of the incumbent government rigging the results. However, a new computerised ID system was introduced before the 2001 elections, resulting in opposition parties contesting the elections.

Results

References

Elections in Mauritania
Mauritania
2001 in Mauritania
October 2001 events in Africa
Election and referendum articles with incomplete results